The Lonely City: Adventures in the Art of Being Alone is a non-fiction book written by Olivia Laing. The book was first published by Picador in 2016 and, like Laing's previous works, it blends research, biography and memoir. 

The majority of the research for the book took place when Laing was living alone in New York City after having been abruptly left by a partner. Her reflections on the isolation she felt during this time make their way into the book.

Overview
The book is divided into eight chapters, with each chapter beginning with Laing's experiences being alone in New York, before devolving into reflections on artists and the way in which loneliness permeated their work. In order, the artists discussed are:

Edward Hopper (and his wife Josephine Hopper)
Andy Warhol
David Wojnarowicz
Henry Darger
Klaus Nomi
Josh Harris
Zoe Leonard

Reception
The book was well-received, earning generally positive reviews.

References

Books about artists
Books about New York City
2016 non-fiction books
Picador (imprint) books